Alfred Braunschweiger (October 16, 1885 – June 29, 1952) was a German diver who competed in the 1904 Summer Olympics. In the 1904 Olympics he won a bronze medal in the platform diving event.

References

External links
 
 Alfred Braunschweiger's profile at Sports Reference.com

1885 births
1952 deaths
German male divers
Olympic divers of Germany
Divers at the 1904 Summer Olympics
Olympic bronze medalists for Germany
Olympic medalists in diving
Medalists at the 1904 Summer Olympics
20th-century German people